Kevin Gaudet (born October 22, 1963) is a Canadian former professional ice hockey player, now working as a coach. He is currently serving as head coach of German DEL2 team EC Bad Tölz.

Playing career 
Gaudet attended the Université de Moncton and helped "Les Aigles Bleus" win back-to-back Canadian Interuniversity Athletics Union Men's Ice Hockey championships in 1981 and 1982. The championship-winning teams were inducted into the New Brunswick Sports Hall of Fame in 2004.

He spent some time with the Moncton Hawks of the American Hockey League and was trying out with NHL sides Edmonton Oilers and Minnesota North Stars, before making the move to France, where he played for HC Val Vanoise between 1985 and 1991.

In 1991, Gaudet signed with ESC Wedemark of Germany, serving as player/coach. He led the team to the Oberliga championship and to promotion to the 1. Liga in 1994. Gaudet brought an end to his playing career in 1995 and focussed on coaching at ESC Wedemark after retiring as a player.

Coaching career 
Under Gaudet's tutelage, ESC Wedemark captured the 1.Liga title in his first season as full-time head coach and earned a spot in the German top flight Deutsche Eishockey Liga for the following campaign. His first stint with the organization that changed its name to Hannover Scorpions in 1997, ended in January 2000. However, Gaudet returned to the Hannover bench at the beginning of the 2000-01 campaign, but was relieved of his duties midway through the season in January 2001.

In December 2001, he was named head coach of EHC Straubing of Germany's second division and remained at the job until November 2004. He left Straubing to accept an offer to come back to Hannover for a third stint. Gaudet led the Scorpions to the DEL playoff semifinals in 2005-06 and parted company with the club at the end of the season.

From 2007 to 2011, Gaudet served as head coach of Austrian top-tier club Vienna Capitals.

In November 2011, he assumed head coaching duties with the Bietigheim Stealers who lifted silverware in Gaudet’s first season, capturing the 2011-12 DEB cup competition. In 2012-13, the Bietigheim team won the double of DEB-Pokal and 2. Bundesliga championship and took home the DEL2 title in 2015. Gaudet received 2. Bundesliga Coach of the Year honors in 2013 and DEL2 Coach of the Year distinction in 2015. In the 2017-18 season, he guided Bietigheim to a third championship title.

In May 2018, Gaudet took over the head coaching job at German DEL side Nürnberg Ice Tigers, but in September 2018 parted company with the team only four games into the season due to “different views on tactical and leaderships aspects". In May 2019, he was named head coach of German DEL2 side EC Bad Tölz.

References 

Canadian ice hockey coaches
Ice hockey people from New Brunswick
Sportspeople from Moncton
1963 births
Living people
Canadian expatriate ice hockey people
Canadian expatriate sportspeople in Germany
Canadian expatriate sportspeople in Austria
Canadian expatriate ice hockey players in France
Canadian expatriate ice hockey players in Germany
Naturalized citizens of Germany